Hastings Law Journal is the oldest law journal at the University of California, Hastings College of the Law.  It began in 1949 in San Francisco, California.  As of 1997, it is under the umbrella of the O'Brien Center for Scholarly Publications.
The Journal has six issues per volume in December, January, March, May, June, and August.
Every year, the Journal hosts a symposium inviting speakers from around the country on varied topics.  One issue per volume is dedicated to articles on the Symposium.
Washington & Lee ranks Hastings Law Journal well, coming in at number 31 in 2011.
The application process is an anonymous write-on competition during the summer after first year exams.  Some students are accepted by grades alone, some by the writing competition alone, and some by a combination.  Special circumstances expressed in a personal statement are also considered.  Transfer students may also participate in the write-on competition later in the summer.

Articles Cited in the U.S. Supreme Court
A 1987 article was cited in the recent Supreme Court Case of American Needle Inc. v. National Football League.  The article, Conflicts of Interest and Fiduciary Duties in the Operation of a Joint Venture was written by Professor Zenichi Shishido of Japan.
The famous Fourth Amendment case, Terry v. Ohio
, cites a note, Stop and Frisk Law in California, by then-student Harvey E. Henderson, Jr.

Notable alumni
Associate Justice of California Supreme Court Carol A. Corrigan
Chief Justice of Montana Supreme Court Karla M. Gray
First African American California Supreme Court Justice Wiley Manuel (Editor in Chief of the 1953 volume)
U.S. Ambassador J. Christopher Stevens

Faculty advisors
Justice Roger Traynor

References 

American law journals
Bimonthly journals